The 1948–49 Indiana Hoosiers men's basketball team represented Indiana University. Their head coach was Branch McCracken, who was in his 8th year. The team played its home games in The Fieldhouse in Bloomington, Indiana, and was a member of the Big Nine Conference.

The Hoosiers finished the regular season with an overall record of 14–8 and a conference record of 6–6, finishing 4th in the Big Nine Conference. Indiana was not invited to participate in any postseason tournament.

Roster

Schedule/results

|-
!colspan=8| Regular Season
|-

References

Indiana Hoosiers
Indiana Hoosiers men's basketball seasons
1948 in sports in Indiana
1949 in sports in Indiana